The Pikauba is a semi-firm cheese, farmer made by hand, in the region Saguenay–Lac-Saint-Jean in Quebec. It takes its name from a river, Pikauba River, that crosses the Laurentides Wildlife Reserve.

It is recognized by its fine orange rind and its soft, golden paste, strewn with small holes. Medium in intensity, Pikauba has a buttery taste with fruity aromas. It comes in 2.5 kg or 5 kg format.

The production territory 
Pikauba is made at Lehman cheese dairy located in Hébertville in Saguenay-Lac-Saint-Jean (Quebec). The quality of the fodder plants, the freshness of the cool climate as well as the terroir of the region offer favorable conditions for cheese making.

The story 
The Lehmann Cheese Factory has been in existence since 2001. It is from the recipe, scribbled on a piece of paper by his mother from Jura, Switzerland, that Jacob Lehman makes the first cheeses.

The cheese family says that a quote from Félix Leclerc provided them with the inspiration to produce cheese:“Our lives are like rivers; the calm is deep, the restless flow on the surface.” The Pikauba was produced for the first time in 2005.

A novel by Gérard Bouchard is also entitled Pikaubaa,

Manufacturing 
This semi-soft, washed rind cheese is made with thermised cow's milk. Maturing lasts between 90 and 120 days.

Production is based on a herd of 60 Brown Swiss cows, which is said to be the oldest dairy breed. This mountain cow is appreciated for its ability to give rich milk and a very good cheese yield.

Distinction 
 Finalist at the 2014 Canadian Fine Cheese Competition, category of the best semi-soft cheese.

See also
 List of cheeses

Notes and references

External links 

 Pikauba in the Directory of local cheeses.
 Pikauba file by the Fromagerie Hamel.
 On the site of Plaisirs Gourmets

Canadian cheeses
Cuisine of Quebec
Cow's-milk cheeses
Saguenay–Lac-Saint-Jean